David Friedman  is an associate justice of the New York Appellate Division of the Supreme Court, First Judicial Department.

Early life and education
In 1971, he graduated from Brooklyn College Magna Cum Laude with a degree in Mathematics. He was elected Phi Beta Kappa. In 1975, he graduated from New York Law School Cum Laude. He was an associate editor of the New York Law School Law Review.

Legal career
Prior to joining the bench, he worked as a Law Clerk to Justice Henry Martuscello on the Appellate Division and Justice Nicholas A. Clemente (See: Nicholas Clemente) of the New York Supreme Court, Kings County.

He subsequently served on the New York City Civil Court from 1990 to 1993. He was a New York Supreme Court Justice, from 1994 to 1999. He was designated a Justice for the Appellate Division, First Judicial Department in 1999 by Governor George Pataki.

References

Living people
New York (state) lawyers
Politicians from New York City
Year of birth missing (living people)
Brooklyn College alumni